Antonio Valladolid Rodríguez (born 22 February 1973) is a Mexican politician affiliated with the National Action Party. As of 2014 he served as Deputy of the LX Legislature of the Mexican Congress representing Baja California.

References

1973 births
Living people
Politicians from San Diego
National Action Party (Mexico) politicians
21st-century Mexican politicians
Monterrey Institute of Technology and Higher Education alumni
Deputies of the LX Legislature of Mexico
Members of the Chamber of Deputies (Mexico) for Baja California